is a tarot divination title for the Game Gear where the player gets a tarot reading in Japanese using the Rider–Waite tarot cards. The game was published by Sega for a Japan-exclusive release.

Summary
Only one person can use it at a time but the computer-controlled tarot reader (appearing as a fortune teller) can provide unlimited readings for the player and their friends. Players can choose between three characters, two female and one male, to provide the fortune telling.

Unlike most Japanese tarot reading simulations that use the Celtic cross, House of Tarot uses the hexagram method of reading tarot cards.

See also 
 Taboo: The Sixth Sense 1989 Nintendo video game
 Tarot Mystery 1995 Super Famicom video game

References

1991 video games
Game Gear games
Game Gear-only games
Japan-exclusive video games
Japan System Supply games
Tarotology
Divination software and games
Video games developed in Japan